Slobodan Goračinov (Macedonian: Слободан Горачинов; born 20 January 1963) is a Macedonian football manager and former player.

Playing career
Born in Skopje, SR Macedonia, still young, he came to Belgrade to play in the Yugoslav giants Red Star youth teams. After playing three seasons in their senior team, he returned to his home town, Skopje, and signed with FK Vardar where he would become a standard player. Afterwards, he went abroad, and signed with Austrian Football Bundesliga club Grazer AK where he played until 1990.

Managerial career
After retiring he became a coach, he coached his former club Vardar in the season 1996–97. In the 2014–15 season he coached Serbian side FK Hajduk Beograd playing in the Serbian League Belgrade.

References

External sources
 Profile at Playerhistory

1963 births
Living people
Footballers from Skopje
Association football fullbacks
Macedonian footballers
Yugoslav footballers
Red Star Belgrade footballers
FK Vardar players
Grazer AK players
Yugoslav First League players
Austrian Football Bundesliga players
Yugoslav expatriate footballers
Macedonian expatriate footballers
Expatriate footballers in Austria
Yugoslav expatriate sportspeople in Austria
Macedonian expatriate sportspeople in Austria
Macedonian football managers
FK Vardar managers
FK Makedonija Gjorče Petrov managers
Macedonian expatriate football managers
Expatriate football managers in Serbia